Allen Army Airfield  is a public and military use airport serving Fort Greely and located three miles (5 km) south of the central business district of Delta Junction, a city in the Southeast Fairbanks Census Area of the U.S. state of Alaska. It is owned by the United States Army, which has an agreement with the City of Delta Junction for joint use of the airfield by both military and civilian aircraft.

History 
Established in 1942 as Big Delta Army Airfield, it was named for river delta formed by the confluence of the Delta River and the Tanana River. It was later renamed Allen Army Airfield. Fort Greely was built south of the airfield after World War II.

Facilities and aircraft 
It has three asphalt paved runways: 1/19 is 9,000 by 150 feet (2,743 x 46 m); 10/28 is 6,115 by 150 feet (1,864 x 46 m); 7/25 is 4,057 by 90 feet (1,243 x 27 m).

Two runways are lighted and can accommodate heavy cargo aircraft year-round, including the C-17. Between December and April the runways can accommodate any aircraft, including the C-5A. A  hangar accommodates military aircraft as large as the CH-47. Approximately  of airport ramp space is available. For the 12-month period ending January 3, 1984, the airport had 29,200 aircraft operations, an average of 80 per day: 91% military and 9% general aviation.

See also

 Alaska World War II Army Airfields
 Air Transport Command
 Northwest Staging Route

References

External links 
 Topographic map from USGS The National Map
 

Airports in the Southeast Fairbanks Census Area, Alaska
United States Army airfields
Airfields of the United States Army Air Forces Air Transport Command in Alaska